Eugene Bernard Holiday (born 14 December 1962) is a Sint Maarten politician and the first governor of Sint Maarten, which became a country within the Kingdom of the Netherlands on 10 October 2010. He was installed by the Council of Ministers of the Kingdom of the Netherlands on 7 September 2010. He was president of Princess Juliana International Airport before assuming his office as governor.

Biography

Eugene Bernard Holiday was born on St. Maarten on 14 December 1962 as the fourth of seven children of Eugene Bernard Holiday Sr. and Leonie Cassandra Marsham.

He studied in the Netherlands from 1979, graduating from Catholic University of Brabant with a master's degree (i.e. doctorandus) in economics in 1987.

He married Marie-Louise Hazel in 1990.

References

Living people
Governors of Sint Maarten
1962 births
Tilburg University alumni